Pimelodella is a genus of three-barbeled catfishes.

Pimelodella is the largest genus in the family. However, it is in need of taxonomic revision.

This genus is found on both sides of the Andes, ranging from Panama to Paraguay and southern Brazil. With the exception of P. chagresi, all members of the genus are restricted to South America. This genus includes two species of troglobitic catfishes, P. kronei and P. spelaea.

Species
There are currently 78 recognized species in this genus:
 Pimelodella altipinnis (Steindachner, 1864)
 Pimelodella australis C. H. Eigenmann, 1917
 Pimelodella avanhandavae C. H. Eigenmann, 1917
 Pimelodella boliviana C. H. Eigenmann, 1917
 Pimelodella boschmai van der Stigchel, 1964
 Pimelodella brasiliensis (Steindachner, 1877)
 Pimelodella breviceps (Kner, 1858)
 Pimelodella buckleyi (Boulenger, 1887)
 Pimelodella chagresi (Steindachner, 1876)
 Pimelodella chaparae Fowler, 1940
 Pimelodella conquetaensis C. G. E. Ahl, 1925
 Pimelodella cristata (J. P. Müller & Troschel, 1848)
 Pimelodella cruxenti Fernández-Yépez, 1950
 Pimelodella cyanostigma (Cope, 1870)
 Pimelodella dorseyi Fowler, 1941
 Pimelodella eigenmanni (Boulenger, 1891)
 Pimelodella eigenmanniorum (A. Miranda-Ribeiro, 1911)
 Pimelodella elongata (Günther, 1860)
 Pimelodella enochi Fowler, 1941
 Pimelodella eutaenia Regan, 1913
 Pimelodella figueroai Dahl, 1961
 Pimelodella geryi Hoedeman, 1961
 Pimelodella gracilis (Valenciennes, 1835) (Graceful pimelodella)
 Pimelodella griffini C. H. Eigenmann, 1917
 Pimelodella grisea (Regan, 1903)
 Pimelodella hartii (Steindachner, 1877)
 Pimelodella hartwelli Fowler, 1940
 Pimelodella hasemani C. H. Eigenmann, 1917
 Pimelodella howesi Fowler, 1940
 Pimelodella ignobilis (Steindachner, 1907)
 Pimelodella itapicuruensis C. H. Eigenmann, 1917
 Pimelodella kronei (A. Miranda-Ribeiro, 1907)
 Pimelodella lateristriga (M. H. C. Lichtenstein, 1823)
 Pimelodella laticeps C. H. Eigenmann, 1917
 Pimelodella laurenti Fowler, 1941
 Pimelodella leptosoma (Fowler, 1914)
 Pimelodella linami L. P. Schultz, 1944
 Pimelodella longipinnis (Borodin, 1927)
 Pimelodella macrocephala (Miles, 1943)
 Pimelodella macturki C. H. Eigenmann, 1912
 Pimelodella martinezi Fernández-Yépez, 1970
 Pimelodella meeki C. H. Eigenmann, 1910
 Pimelodella megalops C. H. Eigenmann, 1912
 Pimelodella megalura A. Miranda-Ribeiro, 1918
 Pimelodella metae C. H. Eigenmann, 1917
 Pimelodella modestus (Günther, 1860)
 Pimelodella montana W. R. Allen, 1942
 Pimelodella mucosa C. H. Eigenmann & Ward, 1907
 Pimelodella nigrofasciata (Perugia, 1897)
 Pimelodella notomelas C. H. Eigenmann, 1917
 Pimelodella odynea L. P. Schultz, 1944
 Pimelodella ophthalmica (Cope, 1878)
 Pimelodella pallida Dahl, 1961
 Pimelodella papariae (Fowler, 1941)
 Pimelodella pappenheimi C. G. E. Ahl, 1925
 Pimelodella parnahybae Fowler, 1941
 Pimelodella parva Güntert, 1942
 Pimelodella pectinifer C. H. Eigenmann & R. S. Eigenmann, 1888
 Pimelodella peruana C. H. Eigenmann & G. S. Myers, 1942
 Pimelodella peruensis Fowler, 1915
 Pimelodella procera Mees, 1983
 Pimelodella rendahli C. G. E. Ahl, 1925
 Pimelodella reyesi Dahl, 1964
 Pimelodella robinsoni (Fowler, 1941)
 Pimelodella roccae C. H. Eigenmann, 1917
 Pimelodella rudolphi A. Miranda-Ribeiro, 1918
 Pimelodella serrata C. H. Eigenmann, 1917
 Pimelodella spelaea Trajano, R. E. dos Reis & Bichuette, 2004
 Pimelodella steindachneri C. H. Eigenmann, 1917
 Pimelodella taeniophora (Regan, 1903)
 Pimelodella taenioptera A. Miranda-Ribeiro, 1914
 Pimelodella tapatapae C. H. Eigenmann, 1920
 Pimelodella transitoria A. Miranda-Ribeiro, 1907
 Pimelodella vittata (Lütken, 1874)
 Pimelodella wesselii (Steindachner, 1877)
 Pimelodella witmeri Fowler, 1941
 Pimelodella wolfi (Fowler, 1941)
 Pimelodella yuncensis Steindachner, 1902

References

 
Heptapteridae
Catfish of South America
Catfish genera
Freshwater fish genera
Freshwater fish of South America
Freshwater fish of Brazil
Taxa named by Carl H. Eigenmann
Taxa named by Rosa Smith Eigenmann
Taxonomy articles created by Polbot